Colorado's 27th Senate district is one of 35 districts in the Colorado Senate. It has been represented by Democrat Tom Sullivan since 2023. Prior to redistricting the district was represented by Democrat Chris Kolker and Republican Jack Tate.

Geography
District 27 is based in Centennial, a suburb of Denver in southern Arapahoe County, and also covers nearby Dove Valley.

The district is located entirely within Colorado's 6th congressional district, and overlaps with the 3rd, 36th, 37th, and 38th districts of the Colorado House of Representatives.

Recent election results
Colorado state senators are elected to staggered four-year terms. The old 27th district held elections in presidential years, but the new district drawn following the 2020 Census will hold elections in midterm years.

2022
The 2022 election will be the first one held under the state's new district lines. Incumbent Senator Chris Kolker was redistricted to the 16th district, which won't be up until 2024; State Rep. Tom Sullivan is running for the 27th district instead.

Historical election results

2020

2016

2012

Federal and statewide results in District 27

References 

27
Arapahoe County, Colorado